A442 may refer to:

 A442 road (England)
 Renault Alpine A442, a type of car
 A442 (pitch standard)